The 2009 Southeastern Conference football season started on Thursday, September 3 as conference member South Carolina visited North Carolina State. The conference's other 11 teams began their respective 2009 season of NCAA Division I FBS (Football Bowl Subdivision) competition on Saturday, September 5.  All teams started their season at home except Kentucky, who started their season on neutral turf at Paul Brown Stadium in Cincinnati, Ohio against Miami (OH),  Georgia, who traveled to Oklahoma State, and Alabama, who traveled to the Georgia Dome to face Virginia Tech in the Chick-fil-A College Kickoff for the second straight year.

Bowl games
The SEC was the second conference to send 10 teams to bowl games in a given year. The ACC was the first to do so in 2008.

Awards and All-SEC Teams
2009 AP All-SEC First Team

Offense
  

Defense

Rankings

SEC vs. BCS matchups

Previous season
During the 2008 NCAA Division I FBS football season, Florida and Alabama won their respective divisions and met in the 2008 SEC Championship Game which Florida won 31–20. Florida went on to win the 2009 BCS National Championship while SEC Runner-Up Alabama lost in the Sugar Bowl.  Georgia was the heavy favorite to win the SEC in the pre-season, but did not live up to the hype.  The Bulldogs, however, did finish strong winning the Capital One Bowl.  Other bowl winners include Chick-fil-A Bowl champion LSU, Cotton Bowl Classic champion Ole Miss, Liberty Bowl champion Kentucky, Music City Bowl champion Vanderbilt

Preseason
Tennessee head coach Lane Kiffin begins his first season in Knoxville.  Kiffin is a former head coach of the Oakland Raiders and assistant coach at USC. Gene Chizik also begins his first season as head coach at Auburn.

In a given year, each SEC team will play its five other division foes plus three opposing division opponents.  Each team has a set opposing division opponent.  The other teams from the division are on a rotation, playing a home/away series every five seasons.

The Southeastern Conference announced on July 22 that the SEC media had elected Florida and Alabama as the preseason favorites for their divisions for the 2009 football season.  It chose Florida quarterback Tim Tebow as the Preseason Offensive Player of the Year and Tennessee cornerback Eric Berry  as the Preseason Defensive Player of the Year.

In the preseason Coaches' Poll released on August 7, the SEC was one of only three conferences with multiple teams ranked in the top ten. Florida was elected pre-season #1 while Alabama, LSU, Ole Miss, and Georgia also were in the top 25.

References